Kordes or Korde can be:

Wilhelm Kordes (1865-1935), German horticulturist
Shirish Korde (born 1945), Ugandan composer
Ursula Kordes, wife of Hans Detterman Cronman (c.1600-?), Lord of Alatskivi